Knockdavie Castle is a now-ruined 17th-century house in Burntisland parish, Fife, Scotland. The name probably derives from the Gaelic cnoc dubh -in "(place of the) black hill(ock)", with cnoc dabhoch “the hill farm” another theory. It is recorded under the alternative name of Stenhouse (stone house) in 1561, which survives in the name of the modern day adjacent farmhouse. It is said to have belonged, in the seventeenth century, to a Douglas, recorded in an appendix to The Scots Worthies as an opponent of the Covenanters.

References

Ruined castles in Fife
Listed castles in Scotland
Scheduled monuments in Scotland